Ingrid Catriena Petronella Jagersma (born 8 May 1959) is a New Zealand former cricketer who played as a wicket-keeper and right-handed batter. She appeared in 9 Test matches and 34 One Day Internationals for New Zealand between 1984 and 1990. She captained New Zealand in one ODI, which was won. She played domestic cricket for Canterbury, North Shore and North Harbour.

References

External links

1959 births
Living people
Cricketers from Christchurch
New Zealand women cricketers
New Zealand women's One Day International captains
New Zealand women Test cricketers
New Zealand women One Day International cricketers
New Zealand women cricket captains
Canterbury Magicians cricketers
North Shore women cricketers
North Harbour women cricketers
Wicket-keepers